Claude is an albino alligator (Alligator mississippiensis) at the California Academy of Sciences. Claude lacks the pigment melanin, resulting in colorless skin, and he has poor eyesight associated with his albinism.

Background
Claude was hatched on 15 September 1995 in Florida weighing . He has 76 teeth.

He was in danger in the wilderness owing to albinism which did not allow him to camouflage into his surroundings like other alligators. There are only a couple of dozen known albino alligators in the world, all in captivity. Claude was taken to the California Academy of Sciences in 2008. In 2009, a finger on Claude's right claw was amputated after developing an infection from being bitten by another alligator.

Claude appears completely white because he lacks the pigment melanin. He also has poor eye-sight due to his albinism.

References

Individual albino animals
Golden Gate Park
Individual alligators
1995 animal births
Individual animals in the United States
California Academy of Sciences